The 1984 Brownlow Medal was the 57th year the award was presented to the player adjudged the fairest and best player during the Victorian Football League (VFL) home and away season. Peter Moore of the Melbourne Football Club won the medal by polling twenty-four votes during the 1984 VFL season.

Leading votegetters 
* The player was ineligible to win the medal due to suspension by the VFL Tribunal during the year.

References 

1984 in Australian rules football
1984